University Mall may refer to:
University Mall (Carbondale, Illinois)
University Place (Chapel Hill, North Carolina), formerly University Mall
University Mall (Little Rock, Arkansas)
University Mall (Orem, Utah)
 University Town Plaza, formerly University Mall, in Pensacola, Florida
University Mall (South Burlington, Vermont)
University Mall (Tampa, Florida)
University Mall (Tuscaloosa, Alabama)

See also
University Square (Madison)